Kangaroo Lake is the largest inland lake in Door County, Wisconsin, United States. It is located in the towns of Baileys Harbor and Jacksonport, and is the main feature of Kangaroo Lake State Natural Area.

The lake, located a half mile from Lake Michigan, is fed by Piel Creek and surrounded by a lowland marsh. The bottom of the lake is lined with marl. Many types of fish can be found in the lake.

The surrounding area is a tourist destination.

See also
 List of lakes of Wisconsin § Door County

References

External links
Kanagaroo Lake State Natural Area from the Wisconsin Department of Natural Resources
R & R in Baileys Harbor with Kristin Peil and Suzanne Bauldry by the Baileys Harbor Historical Society, Sevestopol TV, May 26, 2012, 1:20:33 long, (covers resorts on Kangaroo Lake)
History of Kangaroo Lake with Patty Williamson by the Baileys Harbor Historical Society, Sevestopol TV, July 17, 2012, 1:20:33 long

Lakes of Door County, Wisconsin